Joana Sousa is a Portuguese sprint canoer and marathon canoeist who has competed since the late 2000s. She won a bronze medal in the K-4 200 m event at the 2009 ICF Canoe Sprint World Championships in Dartmouth.

References
Canoe09.ca profile 

Living people
Portuguese female canoeists
Year of birth missing (living people)
ICF Canoe Sprint World Championships medalists in kayak